Naane Varuven may refer to:

 Naane Varuven (1992 film)
 Naane Varuven (2022 film)